Hampstead station may refer to:

Hampstead tube station
Hampstead railway station (Metropolitan & St John's Wood Railway)
West Hampstead tube station
West Hampstead railway station
Hampstead Heath railway station
West Hampstead Thameslink railway station